Odła ( - Odla) is a river of Poland and Belarus, a tributary of the Svislach. Its source is near the village Zubrzyca Mała in eastern Poland. It crosses the border with Belarus, and flows into the Svislach near the village Pachobuty, Byerastavitsa District.

Rivers of Poland
Rivers of Podlaskie Voivodeship
Rivers of Grodno Region
Rivers of Belarus